Saint-Agnan is the name or part of the name of several communes in France:

Saint-Agnan, Aisne
Saint-Agnan, Nièvre
Saint-Agnan, Saône-et-Loire
Saint-Agnan, Tarn
Saint-Agnan, Yonne
Saint-Agnan-de-Cernières, in the Eure  
Saint-Agnan-en-Vercors, in the Drôme  
Saint-Agnan-le-Malherbe, in the Calvados  
Saint-Agnan-sur-Erre, in the Orne 
Saint-Agnan-sur-Sarthe, in the Orne